The Colonel (Pom Mai Yak Pen Pan To, literally "I don't want to be a lieutenant colonel") is a 1974 Thai action-thriller film directed by Chatrichalerm Yukol.

Plot
The story follows the exploits of a Thai intelligence officer who must assume the identity of a slain lieutenant colonel in a neighboring country's military who was working as a double agent.

Cast
 Sompop Benjatikul as The Colonel
 Naiyana Chaiwanan as Lamduan

DVD
The film has been released in Thailand on a PAL-encoded all-region DVD with English subtitles by Mangpong.

References

1974 films
1970s spy films
Thai action films
Thai-language films
1970s action thriller films
Films directed by Chatrichalerm Yukol
Thai thriller films